Cecil Lewis (born February 3, 1981) is an American soccer player who last played for the Norfolk SharX in the Major Indoor Soccer League.

Career
Lewis grew up in Georgia, attended community college for one year, then moved to Virginia Beach with his girlfriend to attend Tidewater Community College.  He played one season with Tidewater, scoring seventeen goals in ten games.  This brought him to the attention of the Virginia Beach Mariners who signed him for the 2002 A-League season.  After two season with the Mariners, Lewis moved to the Wilmington Hammerheads for the 2004 season.  He played one regular season game before suffering a season-ending injury.  The injury forced him to sit out the 2005 season as well and in April 2006, he signed with the Richmond Kickers.  In 2007, he played for the amateur Fredericksburg Gunners, Crystal Palace Baltimore and, most recently, the Real Maryland Monarchs.  In November 2011, Lewis began playing for the Norfolk SharX of the Major Indoor Soccer League.

References

External links
Real Maryland Monarchs bio

1981 births
Living people
American soccer players
USL First Division players
USL Second Division players
Virginia Beach Mariners players
Richmond Kickers players
Crystal Palace Baltimore players
Fredericksburg Gunners players
Real Maryland F.C. players
USL League Two players
Wilmington Hammerheads FC players
Association football midfielders
Sportspeople from Fayetteville, North Carolina
Soccer players from North Carolina
Major Indoor Soccer League (2008–2014) players